The Bowlus TG-12 was a proposed American training glider conceived by Bowlus in the early 1940s.

Design and development
The TG-12 was designed as a two-seat training glider with a side-by-side cockpit configuration, based on the company's XBM-5 (company designation). Three TG-12s were ordered on 28 April 1942 with the serials 42-96830/96832 along with a static test airframe, but the order was cancelled on 5 August 1943 without any aircraft being built.

Variants
Bowlus XTG-12-BS 2 completed (Baugher lists only 42-57200), 3 ordered
Bowlus XTG-12A-BS conflicting info., poss. side-by-side one ordered/poss. civil impress.
Bowlus TG-12A-BS [Project] production model, contract cancelled
(Note: the TG-12B was a separate design: a Bowlus built Mitchell M1PU3

Specifications

See also

References

External links

1940s United States sailplanes
Glider aircraft